On 27 July 1934, a Swissair Curtiss AT-32C Condor II passenger aircraft crashed near Tuttlingen, Germany, while flying through a thunderstorm. All twelve people on board were killed. It was the worst air crash in 1934 and Swissair's first aviation accident since its founding in 1931.

Aircraft and occupants
The aircraft involved in the accident, registered CH-170, was a Curtiss AT-32C Condor II, a variant of the standard T-32 developed specifically for Swiss flag carrier Swissair, which was its only operator.  CH-170 had entered service on 28 March 1934 and, at the time of the accident, had only been in service for four months.  The cabin was configured with seating for up to 15 people.

The aircraft's flight attendant, Nelly Diener, also known as the Engel der Lüfte ("Angel of the Skies"), is notable for being Europe's first air stewardess.  She had been working for Swissair since 1 May 1934.  The other two crew members were the pilot, Armin Mühlematter, and the radio navigator, Hans Daschinger.  On the fatal flight, there were nine passengers aboard.

Accident

The aircraft departed Zurich for Berlin, with stopovers in Stuttgart and Leipzig. The right wing eventually broke off; the plane fell into a forest near Tuttlingen, exploding into flames on impact.

Investigation

Investigators found that oscillations in the wing had caused a stress fracture, the severity of which was exacerbated by the violent weather conditions in which the aircraft was flying.  German investigators, however, determined that one fracture formed in the wing and engine mount structure due to defective construction and welding techniques in conjunction with the engine vibrations, while a second fracture resulted from the force of the turbulence in the storm.

References

1934 in Germany
1934 in Switzerland
Aviation accidents and incidents in 1934
Airliner accidents and incidents caused by in-flight structural failure
Airliner accidents and incidents caused by weather
1934
Aviation accidents and incidents in Germany